Zhang Shan Qi (born 1 April 1991) is a racecar driver from China. He competed in Australian Formula 3 in 2009 and 2010, and the Intercontinental Le Mans Cup in 2010 and 2011.

Zhang Shan Qi who was born in Heilongjiang, China in 1991. He is the only child of his family. He was brought to live and study in Guangzhou with his parents. Shan Qi has always been interested in motor racing and have been looking for opportunities to participate since young. Shan Qi came to know his mentor who is also his current coach, Chen Wei Liang and joined PTRS Racing in the year 2007.

Asian Formula Renault Challenge
At the age of 17, Zhang Shan Qi achieved his dream of becoming a racing driver. On 21 Sept 2008, he entered his first ever race. In his first race he failed to finish but in the second race, he finished 13th.

Australian Formula 3

Zhang Shan Qi took part in the 2009 and 2010 Australian Formula 3 Championships. In the 2009 season, he drove a part season for R-Tek Motorsport Services in the National A class. He finished 13th in class with 8 points.

For the 2010 season, he moved to Team BRM and the Gold Star class. He finished the season in fourth place overall with 97 points. His best finishes in a race were fourth places at Mallala Motor Sport Park and Morgan Park Raceway.

Intercontinental Le Mans Cup
In November 2010, he raced for Hope Polevision Racing in the Formula Le Mans category in the Intercontinental Le Mans Cup - 1000km of Zhuhai race. His team was the sole entry in the class and it won the class honours.

In May 2011, Zhang Shan Qi again wins the Formula Le Mans class with teammates Luca Moro and Nicolas Marroc of Hope Polevision Racing at the 1000km of Spa-Francorchamps.

In June 2011, Zhang Shan Qi also took part in the Ferrari Challenge APAC. He finished 13th overall and 10th in class in the first race at Zhuhai International Circuit due to a problem with his door, but performed strongly in race 2, he finished third overall and second in class.

In November 2011, Zhang Shan Qi will drive a Formula Le Mans car at Zhuhai International Circuit, at the final round of the ILMC again. He and teammate Chen Wai-Liang qualified 12th and finished in 17th place overall in the race.

Half marathon
Zhang Shan Qi will enter the half-marathon to be held in December in Zhuhai.

References

External links
 PTRS driver profile
 Castrol Edge Ranking profile

Living people
1991 births
Chinese racing drivers
Asian Formula Renault Challenge drivers
Australian Formula 3 Championship drivers
European Le Mans Series drivers
Sportspeople from Heilongjiang
21st-century Chinese people